The Wartburg is a castle overlooking the town of Eisenach, Germany.

Wartburg may also refer to:

Places
 Wartburgkreis, a district in Germany
 Wartburg, Illinois, a suburb of Saint Louis, Missouri, United States
 Wartburg, Tennessee, a city in Morgan County, Tennessee, United States
 Wartburg, Ontario, Canada
 Wartburg, KwaZulu-Natal, a town in KwaZulu-Natal Province, South Africa

Organizations
 Wartburg College, a Lutheran college in Waverly, Iowa, and Denver, Colorado
 Wartburg Adult Care Community, in Mount Vernon, New York
 Wartburg Theological Seminary, a Lutheran seminary in Dubuque, Iowa

Other uses
 Wartburg (marque), former East German brand of automobiles, manufactured in Eisenach